Attenella margarita is a species of spiny crawler Mayfly in the family Ephemerellidae. It is found in the southern half of Canada and the continental United States.

References

Mayflies
Articles created by Qbugbot
Insects described in 1927